Bruxelles is a small community located in the Municipality of Lorne, Manitoba, Canada.  It was founded in 1892 by Belgian immigrants.  The name was chosen by Archbishop Alexandre-Antonin Taché of Roman Catholic Archdiocese of Saint Boniface partially because of the origin of the local settlers and also because it was the home city of the communities first Parish priest, Father G. Willems.  Also, the French spelling was chosen (rather than the Dutch name Brussel or the English name Brussels) most likely because the Archbishop and the archdiocese were Francophone.

The original town site lay some 3 km (two miles) north of its current location.  It was moved because the original town site was considered a poor location.

The community was the setting for the 2003 National Film Board of Canada animated short Louise, which explored a day in the life of filmmaker Anita Lebeau's 96-year-old Belgian Canadian grandmother, Louise Marginet, a Bruxelles resident.

Its postal code is R0G 0G0.

See also
Immigration to Canada
List of regions of Manitoba
List of rural municipalities in Manitoba

References

External links
Watch Louise at NFB.ca (Requires Adobe Flash)

Unincorporated communities in Pembina Valley Region
Belgian Canadian
Manitoba communities with majority francophone populations